RIC TV (Rede Independência de Comunicação or in English Independence Network Communications) is a Brazilian television network affiliated to RecordTV.

History
It was created in 1987 in Curitiba, Paraná. In 2008 started to operate in Santa Catarina and lasted until 2019.

Broadcasters members

Paraná 
RIC TV Curitiba (Curitiba) -  7
RIC TV Cornélio Procópio (Cornélio Procópio) -  12
RIC TV Maringá (Maringá) -  13
RIC TV Toledo (Toledo) -  7

Television networks in Brazil
RecordTV affiliates
Portuguese-language television networks
Television channels and stations established in 1987
Mass media in Curitiba
Companies based in Curitiba